Barycheloides is a genus of South Pacific brushed trapdoor spiders first described by Robert Raven in 1994.

Species
 it contains five species, all found on New Caledonia:
Barycheloides alluviophilus Raven, 1994 (type) – New Caledonia
Barycheloides chiropterus Raven, 1994 – New Caledonia
Barycheloides concavus Raven, 1994 – New Caledonia
Barycheloides rouxi (Berland, 1924) – New Caledonia
Barycheloides rufofemoratus Raven, 1994 – New Caledonia

References

Barychelidae
Mygalomorphae genera
Spiders of Oceania